Gaby Dohm (born 23 September 1943 in Salzburg) is a German actress. She is the daughter of actor Will Dohm and actress Heli Finkenzeller.

Selected filmography
 When Mother Went on Strike (1974)
 The Serpent's Egg (1977)
 Doktor Faustus (1982)
 The Black Forest Clinic (1985–1989, TV series)
 Rosenstrasse (2003)

References

External links

 

1943 births
German film actresses
German television actresses
Living people
Actors from Salzburg
20th-century German actresses
21st-century German actresses